Your Turn to Die is a 1967 Italian-French crime-thriller movie directed by Michele Lupo.

Plot
A gang of criminals, in agreement with a model, set their eyes on some jewelry presented during a fashion show and worn by beautiful models. The diamonds, collected with patience by some associations of collectors, belonged to women of high society and some of them date back to the age of French absolutism. When one of the robbers tries to get away with the loot, his fellow conspirators shoot him in the back. The robber, Gordon, manages to give a clue to newspaper reporter Robert Foster, who sets off to retrieve the diamonds. Despite becoming a target for the rest of the gang, Foster prefers to rely on fashion model Arabella and newspaper photographer Flash instead of the more seasoned Inspector Chandler.

Cast  
 Claudio Brook as Robert
 Daniela Bianchi as Arabella
 Sidney Chaplin as Inspector Chandler
 Jess Hahn as Boris
 Yves Vincent as Felton
 Stefania Careddu as Katja
 Paolo Gozlino as Gordon
 Harriet White as Assistant Doctor
 Nazzareno Zamperla as Flash
 Anthony Dawson as Dr. Evans
 Jacques Herlin as Actor at recital
 Andrea Bosic as The Diplomat 
 Tina Aumont as Dolly
 Raymond Bussières as Train conductor
 George Wang as Chang
 John Karlsen
 Guido Lollobrigida

References

External links
 
  
Italian crime thriller films
French crime thriller films
1960s crime thriller films
Films directed by Michele Lupo
Films scored by Francesco De Masi
1960s Italian-language films
1960s French films
1960s Italian films